Patrick Byskata (born 13 August 1990) is a Finnish football player.

Byskata is the cousin of HJK footballer Sebastian Mannström.

Career
On 3 November 2011 IFK Mariehamn signed Byskata from FF Jaro on a two-year contract.

After leaving KPV in January 2019, he returned to the club again six months later.

References

External links
 Profile at veikkausliiga.com 
 Veikkausliiga Hall of Fame 

1990 births
Living people
Finnish footballers
Finnish expatriate footballers
FF Jaro players
IFK Mariehamn players
Kokkolan Palloveikot players
Bryne FK players
Brattvåg IL players
Veikkausliiga players
Ykkönen players
Kakkonen players
Norwegian First Division players
Norwegian Second Division players
Association football defenders
Association football midfielders
Finnish expatriate sportspeople in Norway
Expatriate footballers in Norway
GBK Kokkola players
People from Kokkola
Sportspeople from Central Ostrobothnia